The Garmin nüvifone was a line of Internet-enabled mobile phones and personal navigation devices manufactured by Garmin and Asus in partnership, first released in 2010. It has a touchscreen with virtual keyboards and buttons.

Availability
In Canada, the Garmin nüvifone A50 was exclusive to Vidéotron Mobilité.  The carrier no longer sells this smartphone.

Smartphones
2010 introductions